Jean Francois Rivet High School, Vincennes Rivet High School, or simply Rivet High School  (within Vincennes) is a private, Roman Catholic high school in Vincennes, Indiana.  It is part of the Roman Catholic Diocese of Evansville.

Background
In 1924, the Gibault High School was built for Catholic males.  It closed in 1935 but was reopened in 1947 as Central Catholic High School.  Central Catholic became co-educational during the 1970–71 school year when it was joined with the all-female St. Rose Academy.  The name was changed to Rivet High School, in honor of Jesuit priest Jean Francois Rivet who in 1795 had been paid by President Washington to run a school in Vincennes, the first public school established in the Indiana Territory.

Notable alumni
 Bruce Bouillet

See also
 List of high schools in Indiana

References

External links
 School Website

High schools in Southwestern Indiana
Vincennes, Indiana
Roman Catholic Diocese of Evansville
Catholic secondary schools in Indiana
Private high schools in Indiana
Blue Chip Conference
Schools in Knox County, Indiana
Educational institutions established in 1924
Private middle schools in Indiana
1924 establishments in Indiana